Geipel is a German surname. Notable people with the surname include:
 Finn Geipel (born 1958),  German architect and urbanist
 Philip Geipel (born 1986), German auto racing driver

See also

Surnames from given names

German-language surnames